Parasitengona is a group of mites, variously ranked as a hyporder or a cohort, between the taxonomic ranks of order and family. 

They are divided into the aquatic Hydrachnidia (water mites) and the terrestrial Trombidia. The latter includes velvet mites and chiggers.

Description 
Many Parasitengona are relatively large (for mite standards) and have a bright red colouration. Other colours include purple, orange, yellow, blue, green and brown. The terrestrial Trombidia are often hypertrichous, meaning they are covered in many irregularly arranged setae. The chelicerae bases are separate, the fixed cheliceral digit is absent and the movable digit is either hooked or linear. The palps are often raptorial with a claw-like seta on the tibia. The gnathosoma is retractable within group Erythraeina. The stigmata and peritremes, when present, are between the cheliceral bases. In Trombidia, there is usually one or two pairs of trichobothria on the prodorsum, and these are often mounted on a linear sclerotised plate (crista metopica). There are almost always well-developed eye lenses. Genital papillae are usually present but vary in their size and number.

Eggs of Trombidia are usually reddish, but those within superfamily Erythraeoidea are brown-black due to a lipid-protein cover. Eggs of Hydrachnidia have a gelatinous sheath.

Life cycle and reproduction 
The life cycle of Parasitengona consists of the egg, prelarva, larva, protonymph (also known as the nymphochrysalis), deutonymph, tritonymph (imagochrysalis) and adult. The larva, deutoynmph and adult stages are active, while the remaining stages are inactive.

The deutonymph is usually the primary growth stage. However, larvae of species of Trombidium and Eutrombidium (Trombidia) and Eylais and Hydrachna (Hydrachnidia) can grow additional cuticle without moulting (neosomy), so these species grow most in the larval stage.

Almost all parasitengones have two distinct sexes (dioecious). Males transfer sperm to females indirectly via stalked spermatophores. Female lay eggs usually in one to three clutches.

Ecology 
Larvae of Parasitengona are usually ectoparasites of arthropods, and they make up most of the red mites that can be found attached to arthropods. Some (e.g. chiggers) use vertebrates as hosts instead. There are also species with free-living larvae.

Some examples are larval Neotrombidium beeri, which live beneath elytra of false mealworm beetles, and larval Arrenurus, which parasitise Odonata. Twenty-one species across six families are myrmecophilous, meaning they are associated with ants. Non-biting midges (Chironomidae) are the most common host for water mites, while crane flies (Tipulidae) are hosts for both water mites and Trombidia.

Deutonymphs and adults are usually predators on other arthropods, especially immobile life stages such as eggs and pupae. Again, some species have other diets, such as species of Balaustium that feed on pollen or on the sap of plants.

Phylogeny 
According to a molecular phylogenetic analysis using the genes 18S, 28S and COI, Hydrachnidia (water mites) is nested within Trombidia (terrestrial parasitengone mites) and the sister group to Calyptostomatoidea, Stygothrombioidea is the sister group to all other Parasitengona, Erythraeoidea and Tanaupodoidea are sister groups, and Trombiculoidea is a paraphyletic clade along with Chyzerioidea in relation to Trombidioidea.

Taxonomy 
As of 2011, the taxonomic composition of Parasitengona was as follows:

 Superfamily Calyptostomatoidea Oudemans, 1923 
 Family Calyptostomatidae Oudemans, 1923 
 Superfamily Erythraeoidea Robineau-Desvoidy, 1828 
 Family Erythraeidae Robineau-Desvoidy, 1828 
 Family Smarididae Kramer, 1878
 Family †Proterythraeidae Vercammen-Grandjean, 1973
 Superfamily Amphotrombioidea Zhang, 1998
 Family Amphotrombiidae Zhang, 1998
 Superfamily Allotanaupodoidea Zhang & Fan, 2007
 Family Allotanaupodidae Zhang & Fan, 2007
 Superfamily Chyzerioidea Womersley, 1954
 Family Chyzeriidae Womersley, 1954

 Superfamily Tanaupodoidea Thor, 1935
 Family Tanaupodidae Thor, 1935
 Superfamily Trombiculoidea Ewing, 1929
 Family Johnstonianidae Thor, 1935
 Family Neotrombidiidae Feider, 1959
 Family Trombellidae Leach, 1815
 Family Leeuwenhoekiidae Womersley, 1944
 Family Trombiculidae Ewing, 1929
 Family Walchiidae Ewing, 1946
 Family Audyanidae Southcott, 1987
 Superfamily Trombidioidea Leach, 1815
 Family Achaemenothrombiidae Saboori, Wohltmann & Hakimitabar, 2010
 Family Neothrombiidae Feider, 1959
 Family Microtrombidiidae Thor, 1935
 Family Trombidiidae Leach, 1815
 Superfamily Yurebilloidea Southcott, 1996
 Family Yurebillidae Southcott, 1996
 Superfamily Hydryphantoidea Piersig, 1896
 Family Hydryphantidae Piersig, 1896
 Family Hydrodromidae Viets, 1936
 Family Rhynchohydracaridae Lundblad, 1936
 Family Teratothyadidae Viets, 1929
 Family Ctenothyadidae Lundblad, 1936
 Family Thermacaridae Sokolow, 1927
 Family Zelandothyadidae Cook, 1983
 Family Malgasacaridae Tuzovskij, Gerecke & Goldschmidt 2007
 Superfamily Eylaoidea Leach, 1815
 Family Eylaidae Leach, 1815
 Family Limnocharidae Grube, 1859
 Family Piersigiidae Oudemans, 1902
 Family Apheviderulicidae Gerecke, Smith & Cook, 1999
 Superfamily Hydrovolzioidea Thor, 1905
 Family Hydrovolziidae Thor, 1905
 Family Acherontacaridae Cook, 1967
 Superfamily Hydrachnoidea Leach, 1815
 Family Hydrachnidae Leach, 1815
 Superfamily Lebertioidea
 Family Bandakiopsidae Panesar, 2004
 Family Stygotoniidae Cook, 1992
 Family Sperchontidae Thor, 1900
 Family Rutripalpidae Sokolow, 1934
 Family Teutonidae Koenike, 1910
 Family Anisitsiellidae Koenike, 1910
 Family Lebertiidae Thor, 1900
 Family Acucapitidae Wiles, 1996
 Family Oxidae Viets, 1926
 Family Torrenticolidae Piersig, 1902
 Superfamily Hygrobatoidea Koch, 1842
 Family Pontarachnidae Koenike, 1910
 Family Limnesiidae Thor, 1900
 Family Omartacaridae Cook, 1963
 Family Wettinidae Cook, 1956
 Family Frontipodopsidae Viets, 1931
 Family Ferradasiidae Cook, 1980
 Family Lethaxonidae Cook, Smith & Harvey, 2000
 Family Hygrobatidae Koch, 1842
 Family Aturidae Thor, 1900
 Family Feltriidae Viets, 1926
 Family Unionicolidae Oudemans, 1909
 Family Pionidae Thor, 1900
 Family Astacocrotonidae Thor, 1927
 Superfamily Arrenuroidea Thor, 1900
 Family Momoniidae Viets, 1926
 Family Nudomideopsidae Smith, 1990
 Family Mideopsidae Koenike, 1910
 Family Athienemanniidae Viets, 1922
 Family Chappuisididae Motas & Tanasachi, 1946
 Family Gretacaridae Viets, 1978
 Family Neoacaridae Motas & Tanasachi, 1947
 Family Mideidae Thor, 1911
 Family Acalyptonotidae Walter, 1911
 Family Kantacaridae Imamura, 1959
 Family Nipponacaridae Imamura, 1959
 Family Harpagopalpidae Viets, 1924
 Family Arenohydracaridae Cook, 1974
 Family Amoenacaridae Smith & Cook, 1997
 Family Laversiidae Cook, 1955
 Family Krendowskiidae Viets, 1926
 Family Arrenuridae Thor, 1900
 Family Bogatiidae Motas & Tanasachi, 1948
 Family Hungarohydracaridae Motas & Tanasachi, 1959
 Family Uchidastygacaridae Imamura, 1956
 Superfamily Stygothrombidioidea Thor, 1935 (1 family) 
 Family Stygothrombiidae Thor, 1935

References

Trombidiformes